A food street is a pedestrianised area that has been designated for restaurants and cafes. Such areas are found in several major Pakistani cities. The food street is lined with food stalls, restaurants, and other food shops, and are typically pedestrianized.  Food streets, and food parks, exist in several metropolitan cities in the country, and attending them has become a social norm, with people using them as both formal and informal meeting areas.

The first food street in Pakistan was Gawalmandi Food Street located in central part of Lahore.  This has been followed by Melody Food Street and the food street in Blue Area in Islamabad, Burns Road in Karachi, the food street near Ghantar Ghar in Peshawar, Qissa Kahwani Bazaar Food Street, Peshawar and a second food street in Lahore at Anarkali. In 2012, a new food street was inaugurated in Lahore near Badshahi Mosque and Lahore Fort.  It was named Fort Road Food Street. 

In Islamabad, prior to the creation of Melody Food Street, restaurants were scattered around the city.   Members of middle class society prefer them because they are less expensive than hotels or high-quality restaurants.

See also 

 Street food
 List of restaurant districts and streets

References 

Restaurant districts and streets in Pakistan
Pakistani cuisine